Long Lane Wood is an area of ancient woodland in the suburb of Monks Orchard within the London borough of Croydon. The wood covers an area of 15.07 acres, is criss crossed by paths and is frequented by dog walkers. The wood is mainly made up of English Oak and the occasional European Beech. Bywood Avenue Bird Sanctuary can be found to the rear of the wood, it is small fenced off area set aside for wildlife. The wood was a part of the Great North Wood and is now managed by the London Wildlife Trust as a part of the Great North Wood Project.

References 

Ancient woods of London
Forests and woodlands of London
Walking in London